Kitazawa (written: 北沢 or 北澤) is a Japanese surname. Notable people with the surname include:

, Japanese singer
, Japanese curler
, Japanese ice hockey player
, Japanese manga artist and painter
, Japanese politician
, Japanese footballer
, Japanese actor and voice actor
, Japanese speed skater

Fictional characters
 Yuki, Riku, and Yoshiki Kitazawa, characters in the manga series Gravitation
, a character from the multimedia franchise BanG Dream!

See also
Higashi-Kitazawa Station
Kami-Kitazawa Station

Japanese-language surnames